Rag and Bone Buffet: Rare Cuts and Leftovers is a compilation album of songs by the English rock band XTC, released in 1990. It brings together single B-sides, BBC sessions, soundtrack contributions, the A- and B-sides of both a Christmas single released by offshoot group The Three Wise Men and solo single recorded by Colin Moulding as The Colonel, as well as other obscurities.

Track listing
All songs credited to XTC, unless otherwise indicated in parentheses.

B-side compilation albums
XTC compilation albums
1990 compilation albums
Virgin Records compilation albums